Shettleston railway station serves the Shettleston area of Glasgow, Scotland and is 3½ miles (5 km) east of Glasgow Queen Street railway station on the North Clyde Line. The station is managed by ScotRail.

History 
Shettleston was opened on 1 February 1871 when the Coatbridge Branch of the North British Railway opened. In 1877, the station became a junction with the opening of the Glasgow, Bothwell, Hamilton and Coatbridge Railway with the commencement of freight services to Bothwell on 1 November 1877 and passenger services on 1 April 1878. The line closed to passenger traffic in July 1955 and completely in 1961 (except for a short section to Mount Vernon that survived for a further four years).

In 2010, Shettleston station received bilingual name boards, in English and Gaelic, the Gaelic reading "Baile Nighean Sheadna". Shettleston station facilities include a ticket office, ticket vending machine, waiting shelter, footbridge, clock, train information displays and seating. The station has two platforms. There is also a car park and a cycle parking stand.

In 2011, the footbridge was replaced - like many others on the North Clyde Line the previous structure had been built as part of the 1959 electrification and was in very poor structural condition.

Services 
Monday to Saturday daytimes:

Half-hourly service towards Edinburgh Waverley (As of August 2016 this service no longer calls at Garrowhill, Easterhouse, Blairhill and Coatdyke. Passengers for these stations should use the half-hourly service towards Airdrie from Balloch instead.) 
Half-hourly service towards Airdrie 
Half-hourly service towards Balloch via Glasgow Queen Street Low Level
Half-hourly service towards Milngavie via Glasgow Queen Street Low Level

Evening services are as follows: 
Half-hourly service towards Airdrie via all stations
Half-hourly service towards Balloch via Glasgow Queen Street Low Level

Sunday services are as follows: 
Half-hourly service towards Edinburgh Waverley 
Half-hourly service towards Helensburgh Central

References

Notes

Sources 

 
 

Railway stations in Glasgow
Former North British Railway stations
Railway stations in Great Britain opened in 1871
SPT railway stations
Railway stations served by ScotRail